A road game or away game is a sports game where the specified team is not the host and must travel to another venue.  Most professional teams represent cities or towns and amateur sports teams often represent academic institutions.  Each team has a location where it practices during the season and where it hosts games.  

When a team is not the host, it must travel to games (usually by bus or car, hence "road", though increasingly also by plane for longer journeys). Thus, when a team is not hosting a game, the team is described as the road team, the visiting team, or the away team, and the game is described as a road game or an away game for that team. The venue in which the game is played is described as the visiting stadium or the road.  The host team is said to be the home team.

The home team is often thought to have a home advantage over the visiting team, because of their familiarity with the environment, their shorter travel times, and the influence that a parochial crowd may have over an official's decisions. A home team advantage that is unique to baseball is familiarity with the home ballpark's outfield dimensions and height of the outfield wall, as well as the size of foul territory and location of in-play obstacles (e.g., a bullpen on the playing field). Major sporting events, if not held at a neutral venue, are often over several legs at each team's home ground, so that neither team has an advantage over the other.

Occasionally, the road team may not have to travel very far at all to a road game. These matches often become local derbies. A few times a year, a road team may even be lucky enough to have the road game played at their own home stadium or arena. This is prevalent in college athletics where many schools will often play in regional leagues or groundshare.

The related term true road game has seen increasing use in U.S. college sports in the 21st century, especially in basketball. While regular-season tournaments and other special events have been part of college sports from their creation, the 21st century has seen a proliferation of such events. These are typically held at neutral sites, with some of them taking place outside the contiguous U.S. (as in the case of the Great Alaska Shootout and Maui Invitational) or even outside the country entirely (such as the Battle 4 Atlantis in The Bahamas). In turn, this has led to the use of "true road game" to refer to contests played at one team's home venue.

Association football

In some association football leagues, particularly in Europe, the away team's fans sit in their own section. Depending on the team's stadium, they will either sit in a designated section or be separated from the home fans by a cordon of police officers and stadium officials. The reason of this arrangement is to prevent conflicts between fans in rival teams, which is a real concern in European association football leagues due to football hooliganism. However, in the semi-professional leagues in England, supporters may be free to mix.  When games are played at a neutral site, for instance the FA Cup final in England which is always played at Wembley Stadium, both teams' fans will be allotted an even number of tickets. This results in each team occupying one half of the stadium. This is different from other sports, particularly in North America, where for the most part relatively few fans travel to games played away from their home stadium. (There are exceptions for teams with large fan bases like the Pittsburgh Steelers.) Home and away fans are also not separated at these games.

See also 
Home (sports)
Away colours

Notes

Terminology used in multiple sports